Giorgos Vasilou (June 21, 1950 – November 2, 2016) was a Greek actor, politician and former footballer. He was also a deputy in the Second Piraeus Region with the New Democracy party from 2004 to 2007 and honorary president of the Charity Department of Cooperative Savings in Larnaca, Cyprus.

Biography 
He was born in Lamia, Greece in 1950. As a child, Vasilou worked at various jobs, along with school. Vasileiou was also playing soccer with PAS Lamia 1964 and he was goalkeeper. During 1970–71 season, he faced AEK Athens F.C. Despite the 1–4 defeat, AEK wanted to join him, but the proposal was declined by his club. That led him to retire from soccer. He studied at the Drama School of Giorgos Bellos where he graduated with honors. On 17 November 1973, during the Athens Polytechnic uprising in 1973, he met his wife, Lia Thermogianni, then a student of Athens Law School, whom he married four years later and had two children.

He has worked alongside Thanasis Vengos, Rena Vlachopoulou and other great names in Greek theatre. In the early 1990s, and after many appearances in plays, movies and television shows, he met Nikos Foskolos, who has since called Vasilou teacher and who confided important roles, most notably that of Stathis Theocharis in the daily series Καλημέρα Ζωή.

During the Greek parliamentary elections of 2004, he was elected by the New Democracy party for deputy. Since 2007, after being deputy in parliament, he continued to work in theater and television. In November 2011, he announced his membership in the Democratic Alliance party and was a resident in the constituency of Piraeus. During the last 12 years of his life, he resided in Salamina with his wife.

He had taken part, and has starred in, many plays and television productions and movies. He also has given his voice to many compilations and children's productions, and has taught at Tragas Drama School.

He died in Salamina on 2 November 2016, after a months-long battle with lung cancer.

Filmography

Videos

Television series

Video theatres

Dubbed productions

References

Sources 
 Αθηναϊκό-Μακεδονικό Πρακτορείο Ειδήσεων:«Έφυγε» απο τη ζωή ο ηθοποιός Γιώργος Βασιλείου 
 Το Βήμα Πέθανε σε ηλικία 66 ετών ο ηθοποιός Γιώργος Βασιλείου 
 Newsroom , CNN Greece Πέθανε ο Γιώργος Βασιλείου 

1950 births
2016 deaths
Greek male stage actors
Greek male film actors
PAS Lamia 1964 players
Greek male television actors
People from Lamia (city)
New Democracy (Greece) politicians
Association football goalkeepers
Greek footballers
Deaths from lung cancer in Greece
Footballers from Lamia (city)